Amanda Ross (born 23 December 1973 in Frankston, Victoria) is an Australian Olympic eventing rider. She competed at the Sydney 2000 Olympics in the individual event. Riding Otto Schumaker, she finished in 20th place with 149 points.

References

External links
 
 
 
 
 

1973 births
Living people
Australian female equestrians
Australian event riders
Equestrians at the 2000 Summer Olympics
Olympic equestrians of Australia
People from Frankston, Victoria
Sportspeople from Melbourne
Sportswomen from Victoria (Australia)